Liadi Taiwo (born 14 June 2002) is a Nigerian weightlifter, who competes in the 76 kg category and represents Nigeria at international competitions. In August 2022,  she won silver at the 2022 Commonwealth Games. She also set a new junior Commonwealth record in the Clean & Jerk.

References

External links 

2002 births
Living people
Nigerian female weightlifters
Commonwealth Games silver medallists for Nigeria
Weightlifters at the 2022 Commonwealth Games
Commonwealth Games medallists in weightlifting
21st-century Nigerian women
Medallists at the 2022 Commonwealth Games